The Greater Antillean bullfinch (Melopyrrha violacea) is a species of bird in the family Thraupidae.

Distribution and habitat
It is found in the Bahamas, Hispaniola (the Dominican Republic and Haiti, as well as surrounding islands), Jamaica, and the Turks and Caicos Islands.
Its natural habitats are subtropical or tropical dry forest, subtropical or tropical moist lowland forest, subtropical or tropical moist montane forest, subtropical or tropical dry shrubland, and heavily degraded former forest.

Taxonomy
The Greater Antillean bullfinch was formally described by the Swedish naturalist Carl Linnaeus in 1758 in the tenth edition of his Systema Naturae under the binomial name Loxia violacea. The specific epithet violacea is from Latin violaceus meaning "violet-coloured". Linnaeus based his description on "The Purple Gross-beak" that had been described and illustrated by Mark Catesby in 1731. The type locality is the Bahamas.

This species was formerly placed in the genus Loxigilla. A molecular phylogenetic study published in 2014 found that Loxigilla was polyphyletic and in the subsequent rearrangement the Greater Antillean bullfinch and the Puerto Rican bullfinch were moved to Melopyrrha.

Subspecies
Five subspecies are recognised:
 M. v. violacea (Linnaeus, 1758) – north, central Bahamas
 M. v. ofella (Buden, 1986) – central, east Turks and Caicos Islands, south Bahamas
 M. v. maurella (Wetmore, 1929) – Tortue Island (off northwest Hispaniola)
 M. v. affinis (Ridgway, 1898) – Hispaniola and surrounding islands 
 M. v. ruficollis (Gmelin, JF, 1789) – Jamaica

References

Further reading
 Raffaele, Herbert; James Wiley, Orlando Garrido, Allan Keith & Janis Raffaele (2003) Birds of the West Indies, Christopher Helm, London.

Greater Antillean bullfinch
Endemic birds of the Caribbean
Birds of the Greater Antilles
Birds of the Bahamas
Birds of Hispaniola
Birds of the Dominican Republic
Birds of Haiti
Birds of Jamaica
Birds of the Turks and Caicos Islands
Greater Antillean bullfinch
Greater Antillean bullfinch
Taxonomy articles created by Polbot